Mohammed Salah K. (born 7 November 1994) is an Indian professional footballer who plays as a defender for I-League club RoundGlass Punjab.

Career statistics

Club

References

1994 births
Living people
People from Malappuram district
Footballers from Kerala
Indian footballers
Association football defenders
DSK Shivajians FC players
Gokulam Kerala FC players
I-League players
Sreenidi Deccan FC players